September in the Rain is the eleventh studio album LP record by blues, R&B and jazz singer Dinah Washington, released on the Mercury Records label.

The title track was released as a single (b/w "Wake the Town and Tell the People"), reaching #23 on the Billboard Hot 100 chart and #5 on the Hot R&B chart.

Track listing
"September in the Rain" (Harry Warren, Al Dubin) 	
"Without a Song" (Vincent Youmans, Billy Rose, Edward Eliscu)
"This Heart of Mine" (Harry Warren, Arthur Freed)
"As Long as I'm in Your Arms" (Clyde Otis, Vin Corso)
"With a Song in My Heart" (Richard Rodgers, Lorenz Hart)
"Softly" (Joe Greene, Eddie Beal) 	
"I Can't Believe That You're in Love with Me" (Jimmy McHugh, Clarence Gaskill)	
"I Was Telling Him About You" (Moose Charlap, Don George)
"I've Got My Love to Keep Me Warm" (Irving Berlin) 	
"I'll Never Kiss You Goodbye" (Clyde Otis)	
"I'll Come Back for More" (Oramay Diamond, Bee Walker, Belford Hendricks)
"Tell Love Hello" (Damita Jo)

References

1960 albums
Dinah Washington albums
Mercury Records albums
Traditional pop albums